Lunella jungi is a species of sea snail, a marine gastropod mollusk in the family Turbinidae, the turban snails.

Distribution
This marine species occurs off Taiwan.

References

External links
 To GenBank (24 nucleotides; 7 proteins)
 To World Register of Marine Species

jungi
Gastropods described in 2006